Jaan Lepp (19 July 1895 Anija Parish, Kreis Harrien – 9 December 1941) was an Estonian track and field athlete, and military lieutenant colonel.

Military and sports career
During World War I, Lepp was a soldier in the Imperial Russian Army. During the Estonian War of Independence, he was the commander of the armoured train. Lepp subsequently went on to make a career in the Estonian Defence Forces, eventually promoted to Lieutenant Colonel.

In 1918 and 1921 he won one gold and two silver medals at Estonian Athletics Championships (high jump and long jump without running, Estonian: paigalt kaugaushüpe). In 1918 he won the Estonian Bandy Championships.

Arrest and execution

Following the Soviet occupation of Estonia, Jaan Lepp was arrested on 23 July 1940; his removal was personally overseen by communist politician Boris Kumm. Lepp was executed by gunshot in Kirov Oblast, Russian Soviet Federative Socialist Republic on 9 December 1941, aged 46.

Legacy
Under the leadership of Anija Parish, a memorial was erected in 1995 on the grounds of Lepp's farm of Peningi on Lepp's 100th birthday. In 2005, to celebrate Lepp's 110th birthday, he was posthumously awarded the gold medal of the Estonian Football Association.

Awards
 1920: Cross of Liberty, VR II/3 
 1925: Cross of Liberty, VR II/2
 1940: Military Order of the Cross of the Eagle, V Class

References

1895 births
1941 deaths
People from Anija Parish
People from Kreis Harrien
Estonian military officers
Estonian male high jumpers
Estonian male long jumpers
Estonian bandy players
Estonian footballers
Estonian football referees
Association footballers not categorized by position
Estonian sportsperson-politicians
Russian military personnel of World War I
Estonian military personnel of the Estonian War of Independence
Recipients of the Cross of Liberty (Estonia)
Recipients of the Military Order of the Cross of the Eagle, Class V
Estonian people executed by the Soviet Union
People who died in the Gulag
People executed by the Soviet Union by firearm